SS is an abbreviation for Schutzstaffel, a paramilitary organisation in Nazi Germany.

SS, Ss, or similar may also refer to:

Places
Guangdong Experimental High School (Sheng Shi or Saang Sat), China
Province of Sassari, Italy (vehicle plate code)
South Sudan (ISO 3166-1 code SS)
SS postcode area, UK, around Southend-on-Sea
San Sebastián, Spanish city

Arts, entertainment, and media
SS (band), an early Japanese hardcore punk band
SS (manga), a Japanese comic 2000-2003
SS Entertainment, a Korean entertainment company
S.S., for Sosthenes Smith, H. G. Wells pseudonym for story A Vision of the Past
SS, the production code for the 1968 Doctor Who serial The Wheel in Space
Sesame Street, American kids' TV show

Language
Ss (digraph) used in Pinyin
ß or ss, a German-language ligature
 switch-reference in linguistics
Scilicet, used as a section sign
 (in the strict sense) in Latin
Swazi language (ISO 639-1 code "ss")

Science and technology
Stainless steel, sometimes marked SS
Suspended solids and settleable solids, in water

Biology and medicine
(+)-sabinene synthase, an enzyme
Serotonin syndrome, due to some serotonergic medications
Sjögren's syndrome, an autoimmune disease
Sweet's syndrome or acute febrile neutrophilic dermatosis

Computing
.ss, top-level domain country code for South Sudan
Screenshot, digital image showing contents of a computer display
Slave select line on a computer data bus
SS register in x86 processor
Super speed USB, or USB 3.0
ss, in the Unix iproute2 collection

Sports
Sareen Sports Industries, India
Shortstop, a fielding position in baseball and softball
Special stage (rallying)
Strong safety, a position in American and Canadian football

Transportation
Corsair International (IATA airline code SS)
Maatschappij tot Exploitatie van Staatsspoorwegen, a Dutch railroad 
Sand Springs Railway in Oklahoma, US, reporting mark
Staatsspoorwegen, a Dutch East Indies railroad
Stockholms Spårvägar, Swedish transport companies

Ships
Ship prefix for steamboat
Ship prefix for steamship
Submarine, by US Navy hull classification

Vehicles
Chevrolet SS, sport sedan
SS Cars Ltd, Jaguar from 1945
SS class blimp, for anti-submarine warfare
Super Sport (Chevrolet), performance option

Other uses
Collar of Esses, a form of livery collar formerly known as a "Collar of SS"
Safety stock, hedge against stockouts
Social security
Sanctioned Suicide, an internet forum for suicide discussion
Society of the Priests of Saint Sulpice, post-nominal
United States Secret Service (founded in 1865)
Waffen-SS, a combat unit (1933-1945) related to the Schutzstaffel

See also
S/S (disambiguation)
SS1 (disambiguation)
SSS (disambiguation)